The men's 470 competition at the 2018 Asian Games was held from 24 to 31 August 2018.

Schedule
All times are Western Indonesia Time (UTC+07:00)

Results
Legend
BFD — Black flag disqualification
DNS — Did not start
DSQ — Disqualification

References

External links
Official website

Men's 470